Best Life, published by Rodale, Inc. in Emmaus, Pennsylvania, was a luxury service magazine for men with a circulation of more than 500,000. The magazine was in circulation between 2004 and May 2009.

History
Spun off from Men's Health in 2004,  Best Life was published ten times a year and had a circulation of more than 500,000. Best Life covered health and fitness, finance, fatherhood, relationship issues and fashion and grooming for men 35 and over, with an emphasis on literary writing, humor, and in-depth research. Under the guidance of editorial director David Zinczenko and editor-in-chief Stephen Perrine, Best Life was named to Adweek's Hot List in both 2007 and 2008, and was nominated for a US National Magazine Award for its investigative feature "Our Oceans Are Turning to Plastic...Are We?"

Best Life was the annual sponsor of the Best Life Vail Film Festival as well as the Best Life Classic Yacht Regatta in Newport, Rhode Island.

The magazine ended after its May 2009 issue.

In May 2012, it was announced that Best Life would be returning in October 2012 as a special interest publication.

Featured writers
In 2005, Best Life established its literary credentials by becoming the first to publish the "lost" manuscript by Jack Kerouac, entitled "Beat Generation". It also became the literary home of writer-at-large David Mamet and columnists Mark Leyner and Billy Goldberg, Jr. Other contributing authors have included Jay McInerney, Denis Johnson, Jim Harrison, and Anthony Bourdain.

References

External links
 

Defunct magazines published in the United States
Magazines disestablished in 2009
Magazines established in 2004
Magazines published in Pennsylvania
Men's Health (magazine)
Men's magazines published in the United States
Monthly magazines published in the United States
Rodale, Inc.